Smell may refer to;
 Odor, airborne molecules perceived as a scent or aroma
 Sense of smell, the scent also known scientifically as olfaction
 "Smells" (Bottom), an episode of Bottom
 The Smell, a music venue in Los Angeles, California
 Code smell, any characteristic of a program that possibly indicates a deeper problem